Berthold Carl Seemann (25 February 1825, in Hanover, Germany – 10 October 1871, in Nicaragua, Central America), was a German botanist. He travelled widely and collected and described plants from the Pacific and South America.

In 1844 he travelled to the United Kingdom to study botany at the Royal Botanic Gardens, Kew. On the recommendation of Sir WJ Hooker, he was appointed naturalist on the voyage of exploration of the American west coast and Pacific by Henry Kellett on HMS Herald, 1847–1851, along with the naturalists Thomas Edmondston, and John Goodridge. The expedition returned via Hawaii, Hong Kong and the East Indies, calling at the Cape in March 1851. Here he met up with his old acquaintance Zeyher, and with Baur and Juritz they climbed Table Mountain on 13 March 1851, Ecklon being unwell and unable to accompany them. On 16 March Zeyher introduced him to Bowie at Wynberg. He left the Cape on 27 March and was back in England on 6 June 1851. The botanical results of the voyage were published as Botany of the Voyage of HMS Herald and he was awarded a Ph.D. by the University of Göttingen in 1853.

In 1859 he travelled to Fiji. Based on his travels he wrote Viti: An Account of a Government Mission to the Vitian or Fijian Islands in the Years 1860-1, and a botanical catalogue of the flora of the islands, entitled Flora Vitiensis: a description of the plants of the Viti or Fiji Islands with an account of their history and properties. This was published in 10 parts between 1865 and 1873. In this work, Seeman named and described 204 of the 297 currently identified plant species.  It was the foundation for Flora Vitiensis Nova, published by Albert C. Smith from 1979 to 1991. In the 1860s he visited South America, travelling in Venezuela in 1864 and Nicaragua from 1866 to 1867. He later managed a sugar estate in Panama and the Javali gold mine in Nicaragua, where he finally succumbed to malaria.

He started and edited the journal Bonplandia from 1853–1862 and the Journal of Botany, British and Foreign from 1863–1871.

"Revision of the natural order Hederaceae" was a series of articles written by Seemann on what is now called the family Araliaceae. They appeared in the Journal of Botany, British and Foreign from 1864 to 1868. In 1868, Seemann published a book by the same title. It contained some original material, as well as reprints of the articles. It was the definitive work on Araliaceae until Hermann Harms published his monograph on the family in Die Natürlichen Pflanzenfamilien in 1898.

The plant genus Seemannia Regel. (Gesneriaceae), Seemannantha Alef. and Seemannaralia R. Viguier (Araliaceae) were named in his honour.

References

External links 
 
  Seemann, Berthold  Seemann, Berthold, 1825-1871  Biodiversity Heritage Library.
  Journal of botany, British and foreign volumes 2-6 (1864-1868)  J  Titles  Biodiversity Heritage Library

volume 2 (1864) page 235  page 289
volume 3 (1865) page 73  page 173  page 265  page 361
volume 4 (1866) page 352
volume 5 (1867) page 236  page 285
volume 6 (1868) page 129
 Revision of the Natural Order Hederaceae  Google Books
 Revision of the natural order Hederaceae  Amazon.com

1825 births
1871 deaths
19th-century German botanists
Botanists with author abbreviations
Scientists from Hanover